Susan Nelson may refer to:
 Susan Richard Nelson, American lawyer and judge
 Susan B. Nelson, American environmental activist
 Sue Nelson, science writer and broadcaster
 Susan Frances Nelson Ferree, née Nelson, American journalist and social activist